Houman Seyyedi (born November 29, 1980) is an Iranian actor, director, screenwriter and editor. He has received various accolades, including six Crystal Simorghs–making him the only director to have three wins in Special Jury Prize category–two Hafez Awards, five Iran's Film Critics and Writers Association Awards, a NETPAC Award and an Asian New Talent Award. His sixth film, World War III (2022) won the Orizzonti Award for Best Film at the 79th Venice International Film Festival.

Career
Houman Seyyedi is an Iranian theater, television and cinema actor & director, known for his role in " The Endless Way " series.

His directing of short movies, including ’35 Meters Below Sea Level’ and ‘Blue Tooth’, earned him several awards at Tehran International Short Film Festival. He also directed his first long movie ‘Africa’ in 2010.

Seyyedi, who was the writer as well as editor of ‘Africa’, managed to receive an award for Best Movie in video works section of the 29 Fajr International Film Festival.

He has participated in several movies, including ‘Fireworks Wednesday’ (2005), ‘Barefoot in Heaven’ (2005), ‘He Who Goes to Sea’ (2006), ‘The Wound on Eve’s Shoulder’ (2007), ‘The Freeway’ (2010), ‘Thirteen’ (2012), ‘The Exclusive Line’ (2013), ‘Confessions of My Dangerous Mind’ (2014), ‘Buffalo’ (2014), ‘I am Diego Maradona’ (2014), ‘Sleep Bridge’ (2015) and ‘Profiles’ (2015).

Filmography

Film

Web

Television Series

Television Film

References

External links 

Living people
1980 births
People from Rasht
Iranian male film actors
Iranian male stage actors
Iranian male television actors
21st-century Iranian male actors